Thorburn Lake Water Aerodrome  is the name given to two separate docking areas on Thorburn Lake, Newfoundland and Labrador, Canada.  They are open from the middle of April until the middle of November. This Aerodrome is located in Thorburn Lake, which is located about 20 kilometres west of Clarenville. This lake has seasonal residents with cabins as well as locals who call this place home all year round. This lake is not part of the town of Clarenville and the locals maintain the roads yearly and it’s a non tax distract and local service district in the province of Newfoundland and Labrador.

References

Registered aerodromes in Newfoundland and Labrador
Seaplane bases in Newfoundland and Labrador